Gayatri Ganjawala is an Indian playback singer, primarily in Bollywood. She landed up with the part of Princess Anjuli in the West End of London musical production of M. M. Kaye's The Far Pavilions, which opened in the summer of 2007.

Iyer is married to Kunal Ganjawala, an Indian playback singer. She graduated from the Indian Institute of Management Lucknow (IIML) in 2001. One of her well-known songs is "My Dil goes Mmmm" from Salaam Namaste. Famous music directors Anand–Milind used her voice in many of their songs in the mid 90s, the most popular one being the romantic ballad Meri Jaane Jana from the film Insaaf. They recently recorded an English song with her for the cross-over film Don't Tie the Knot.

Discography
 Gulabi (May 1995)
 Loafer (9 June 1996)
 Muqaddar (12 July 1996)
 Daanveer (20 September 1996)
 Insaaf (30 May 1997)
 Yeh Kya Ho Raha Hai? (11 October 2002)
 Chura Liyaa Hai Tumne (21 March 2003)
 Ek Aur Ek Gyarah (28 March 2003)
 Bhoot (30 May 2003)
 Chupke Se (12 September 2003)
 Raghu Romeo (2004)
 Rudraksh (13 February 2004)
 Kismat (20 February 2004)
 Silence Please - The Dressing Room (9 April 2004)
 Masti (9 April 2004)
 Dhoom (27 August 2004)
 Dil Ne Jise Apna Kahaa (10 September 2004)
 Bride and Prejudice (8 October 2004)
 Naach (12 November 2004)
 Hulchul (26 November 2004)
 Elaan (14 January 2005)
 Jurm (18 February 2005)
 Kyaa Kool Hai Hum (6 May 2005)
 Black (2005 film) (2005)
 Salaam Namaste (9 September 2005)
 Dil Jo Bhi Kahey... (23 September 2005)
 Kasak (30 September 2005)
 Ladies Tailor (7 July 2006)
 Alag (16 June 2006)
 Anthony Kaun Hai? (4 August 2006)
 Honeymoon Travels Pvt. Ltd.  (23 February 2007)
 Aadavari Matalaku Arthale Verule (2007)
 Raqeeb (2007)
 Roadside Romeo (2008)
 Tum Hi To Ho (2011)
 Ammaa Ki Boli (2012)
 Gandhi the Hero (2016)
 Nach Baliye Title Song
 India Calling Title Song
 Jodi Kamaal Ki Title song

References
 https://web.archive.org/web/20070930210534/http://www.indiafm.com/celebrities/filmography/6447/
 http://www.tribuneindia.com/2005/20050410/society.htm#2

External links
 

1985 births
Living people
Actresses from Lucknow
Indian women playback singers
Bollywood playback singers
Indian Institute of Management Lucknow alumni
Actresses in Hindi cinema
21st-century Indian actresses
21st-century Indian singers
Singers from Lucknow
21st-century Indian women singers
Women musicians from Uttar Pradesh